Ordinary Hero is a 2022 Chinese drama film directed by  and starring Li Bingbing and Feng Shaofeng. Based on the true story of the race to save a 7-year-old Uygur boy from Hotan, Xinjiang, whose arm was severed in a freak accident. The film follows the boy's journey across 1,400 km, as rescue personnel race against time to complete emergency treatment during the eight golden in which the limb could be preserved. The film was theatrically released on 30 September 2022.

Cast

Main
Li Bingbing as Zhou Yan
Feng Shaofeng as Lin Li

Supporting
Lin Yongjian as Tang Wei
Huang Xiaoming Xie Huiyang
Zhang Yishan as Liu Rui
Parman Parlehati as Mardan
Ai'erfan Aizezi as Abdul
Aziguri Rexiti as Mardan's mother
Zhou Yiran as Yu Li
Gulnazar as Ainur
Ma Tianyu as Song Hui
Du Chun as Chen Liang
Huang Yi as Zhang Rongqin
Niccati Tolson as Akbar
Wang Zixuan as Xia Yan
Zeng Yue as Zhang Muyun
Hankiz Omar
Gulidiar Anaiti
Ayireti Yumaier
Barkley
Hu Bingqing
Na Zhidong
Xi Yuli
Sun Xilun
Zhu Yin
Wu Haochen
Zhang Jing
Juyati Yusuf
Ekremu Ashhar
Guo Jinglin
Bairna Parjehati 
Shi Haozheng
Zhang Zixian
Liu Jun
Wang Ting
Guo Jiahao
Jia Qing

Soundtrack

Production
Production started in Urumqi on 15 September 2021 and ended in Qingdao at the end of October.

Release
Ordinary Hero was released on 30 September 2022, in China.

References

External links
 
 

2022 films
2020s Mandarin-language films
Uyghur-language films
Chinese drama films
Films shot in Xinjiang
Films set in Xinjiang
Films shot in Shandong
Films set in Shandong
2022 drama films
2022 multilingual films
Chinese multilingual films